is a rail shooter video game in which the player controls a World War II Japanese monoplane. The pilot of the respective naval aircraft is required to destroy enemies to clear stages. It was released by Taito in 1985 as an arcade game as well as for the Family Computer.

Gameplay

The player's plane is equipped with machine guns and torpedoes and ammunition is unlimited.

The colour of the sky changes according to the time of the day (afternoon, evening, night). F6F Hellcats (F4U Corsairs in the Arcade Version) are common enemy fighter planes the player will encounter. Occasionally, the  player would run into a B-24 bomber and has to shoot each of its four engines before the B-24 flies away. Sometimes when player has shot down a number of B-24s, they would encounter a falling satellite across the screen. A high number of points would be rewarded if the satellite gets destroyed. There are bonus stages in this game.

Enemy resistance comes not only from the air, but from land and sea as well. Sometimes, an American naval destroyer or submarine would try to down the player's plane with anti-aircraft fire. Aircraft carriers can sometimes be seen in the distant horizon (but can still be sunk with torpedoes). At the end of a stage, the player faces a mobile shore battery on an island. This battery must be destroyed in order to complete the mission. If the player is hit even just once by enemy fire, his plane crashes and he loses one life point. The game is over when all life points are used up.

Sky Invader

A hacked version of this game made by Inventor is known as Sky Invader. The differences between the original and the hacked version are:
Different title screen.
Different music.
Different planes (both the player's and the enemies are modified).
The sky is pink.
The water color is different.
The player starts with nine airplanes instead of three.
The stages are called "WAR".

Reception 
In Japan, Game Machine listed Sky Destroyer on their December 15, 1985 issue as being the third most-successful table arcade unit of the month.

References

1985 video games
Arcade video games
Japan-exclusive video games
Nintendo Entertainment System games
Magical Company games
World War II video games
Taito arcade games
Video games developed in Japan